The Indian Derby is an annual Thoroughbred horse race. It is run over 2,400-metres and held on the first Sunday of February at the Mahalaxmi Racecourse in Mumbai.

History
The "Indian Derby" is the premier horse racing event of the country held annually on the first Sunday of February. A derby is a type of horse race, named after the Epsom Derby, run at Epsom Downs Racecourse in England. It was named after for Edward Smith-Stanley, 12th Earl of Derby, who inaugurated the race in 1780.

The Indian derby, later called the McDowell Indian Derby was sponsored by the United Breweries Ltd from 1984 Until 2022. It is one of the premier sporting activities in the city having the highest cash prize for any single sporting event in India. The race was first held in 1943 and was won by a filly Princess Beautiful, ridden by Edgar Britt. 

There have been many exciting finishes to the Indian Derby but none have come close to the one that occurred on 8 February 1947, a filly named "Her Majesty" ridden by Australian jockey W.T Evans son of 1907 Melbourne Cup winning jockey William (Billy) Evans, had a dramatic fall after the start of the race but both the rider and the horse were brave enough to get back on their feet and run the race only to finish second to Bucephalus by a "nose". Two weeks later Her Majesty beat Bucephalus in the classic Indian St. Leger by twenty lengths.

Derby Winners
List of Indian derby winners:

See also
Mahalaxmi Racecourse
Royal Western India Turf Club

References 
Sports competitions in Mumbai
Horse racing in India

Indian jockeys